There are several lakes named Mud Lake within the U.S. state of Nebraska.

 Mud Lake, Cherry County, Nebraska.	
 Mudd Lake, also known as Mud Lake, Logan County, Nebraska.

References
 USGS-U.S. Board on Geographic Names

Lakes of Nebraska